Mark Krikorian has been the executive director of the Center for Immigration Studies, an anti-immigration think-tank in Washington, D. C., since 1995. Krikorian is a regular contributor to the conservative publication National Review, and is a regular participant at National Review Online's "The Corner."

Krikorian frequently testifies before Congress, and has been quoted in and writes articles in The Washington Post, The New York Times, Commentary, National Review, and elsewhere. He has appeared on 60 Minutes, Nightline, the NewsHour with Jim Lehrer, CNN, National Public Radio and many other television and radio programs. In January 2013, ABC News listed Krikorian as one of the top 20 immigration experts to follow on Twitter in the United States.

Krikorian is credited with popularizing the concept of illegal immigrant self-deportation with the term, "attrition through enforcement".

Childhood, education, and early career
Krikorian was born in the United States to American-born parents of Armenian descent from the (former) Soviet Republic. His father worked as a chef and restaurant manager, moving his family from New Haven, to Boston, Cleveland, Chicago, and then Boston again, always living in densely Armenian neighborhoods. His parents spoke to their children in Armenian but to each other in English. Krikorian knew only Armenian when he entered kindergarten.

He lost his right eye to a retinal blastoma while still a baby.

He earned his B.A. at Georgetown University and a master's at the Fletcher School of Law and Diplomacy at Tufts University, further spending two years studying at the Yerevan State University in then-Soviet Armenia.

Before joining CIS in February 1995, Krikorian was an editor at the Winchester Star, and worked as editor of an electronic media publication on marketing. He wrote for the monthly newsletter of the Federation for American Immigration Reform.

Books
The New Case Against Immigration, Both Legal and Illegal, Sentinel HC, 2008. 
How Obama is Transforming America Through Immigration, Encounter Broadsides, 2010. 
Open Immigration: Yea and Nay, By Mark Krikorian and Alex Nowrasteh, Encounter Books, 2014.

References

External links
The Center for Immigration Studies
Mark Krikorian's Biography

Washington Post Biography
Western Knight Center for Specialized Journalism
 Krikorian debates on illegal immigration at Boston University College of Communication's 24th annual Great Debate on BUniverse.
 Video discussion with Krikorian about immigration on Bloggingheads.tv

Year of birth missing (living people)
Georgetown University alumni
American people of Armenian descent
Living people
Anti-immigration activists
The Fletcher School at Tufts University alumni